The Dell Remote Access Controller (DRAC) is an out-of-band management platform on certain Dell servers. The platform may be provided on a separate expansion card, or integrated into the main board; when integrated, the platform is referred to as iDRAC.

It mostly uses separate resources to the main server resources, and provides a browser-based and/or command-line interface (CLI) for managing and monitoring the server hardware.

Features 
The controller has its own processor, memory, network connection, and access to the system bus. Key features include power management, virtual media access and remote console capabilities, all available through a supported web browser or command-line interface. This gives system administrators the ability to configure a machine as if they were sitting at the local console (terminal).

The DRAC interfaces with baseboard management controller (BMC) chips, and is based on the Intelligent Platform Management Interface (IPMI) 2.0 standard, which allows the use of IPMI out-of-band interfaces such as IPMI Over LAN.

Versions 
The Dell Remote Access Controllers (DRAC) and the Integrated Dell Remote Access Controllers (iDRAC) come in different versions, where a new (i)DRAC version is often linked to a new generation of Poweredge servers.

The hardware is often integrated on the motherboard of the server, and the combined product is termed iDRAC, where the "i" is for integrated. When iDRAC Express is used, the software and hardware systems management functions are shared with one of the server's on-board network interfaces using a unique IP address. By contrast, iDRAC Enterprise version features a dedicated physical network interface.

iDRAC version 7 was introduced in conjunction with the release of Dell PowerEdge generation 12 servers in March 2012, and is only available on 12th generation models. Unlike previous versions the functionality of iDRAC 7 is the same for rack, tower and blade-servers.

An overview of the different versions:

Power management 
With the DRAC enabled and using its own separate network connection, a user may login and reboot the system even if the core operating system has crashed. If the operating system has loaded the correct drivers, the DRAC will attempt to shut down the system gracefully. Without this feature and with the system running, administrators can use the remote console to access the operating system too.

Remote console 
The remote console features of the DRAC allow an administrator to interface with the computer as if sitting in front of it, and one can share the local inputs from keyboard and mouse as well as video output (DRAC does not support remote sound). Remote-console capability relies on either an Active X or Java plug-in, or HTML5 in the later models, which displays a window showing the video output on the local terminal and which takes mouse and keyboard input. This behavior closely resembles that of other remote access solutions such as VNC or RDP but also works if the operating system of the server doesn't work any more (unlike VNC or RDP). It is used to take the server console remotely.

Virtual media 
The DRAC enables a user to mount remotely shared disk-images as if they were connected to the system. In combination with the remote console, this gives administrators the ability to completely re-install an operating system, a task which traditionally required local console access to the physical machine. Administrators can control virtual media through the browser or through the OpenManage tools provided by Dell, though specific versions of browsers restrict some functionality.

Access 
The main DRAC management takes place via a web interface. All generations of the DRAC use the default user name root and the default password calvin. Starting with the DRAC 3, Microsoft Active Directory can also provide authentication either with Dell AD Schema Extensions or Standard Schema.

Implementation 
The DRAC5 and iDRAC6 and higher are embedded platforms running Linux and Busybox. The firmware source code is available on the Dell website, but it is not possible to compile the source into a replacement firmware as Dell does not include a build environment.

The DRAC provides remote access to the system console (keyboard and screen) allowing the system BIOS to be accessed over the Internet when the server is rebooted. This is done by configuring the system BIOS to send its output to a serial port (as a stream of text using VT100-compatible control codes). The chosen serial port is then redirected to the DRAC's serial port. Users can then log into the DRAC via SSH and run a command to connect the SSH session to the serial port, thus allowing the console to be accessed over the Internet.

Earlier versions of the DRAC used ActiveX in Internet Explorer to provide a remote-console interface in a web browser; however, this was unpopular with non-Windows users who did not have access to Internet Explorer. The latest revision of the DRAC6 uses a Java application instead (launched from within the browser), though both the DRAC5 and iDRAC6 also provided the aforementioned platform-independent SSH access.

iDRAC6 
iDRAC6 is available in two levels: iDRAC6 Express and iDRAC6 Enterprise. iDRAC6 Express (which integrates features previously charged for in DRAC5) became a standard offering on Dell's servers. Certain features are not available for the Express version, including the remote console functionality and the vFlash SD card slot. As with iDRAC, iDRAC6 Enterprise is a standard offering on blade servers
 iDRAC6 offers three upgrades: iDRAC6 Express, iDRAC6 Enterprise, and VFlash Media
 iDRAC6 offers power budgeting
 iDRAC6 Enterprise's virtual console and virtual media features are now integrated into a single plug-in
 iDRAC6 Enterprise's virtual console now allows two users to collaborate on the same server
 iDRAC6 now allows customers to view what is on the server LCD without a server-side visit
 iDRAC6 supports IPv6

iDRAC7 
On 6 March 2012, software version 1.00.00 for the iDRAC7 was released for generation 12 servers. iDRAC 7 does not work on earlier generation servers although some of the new functions introduced with iDRAC 7 might be offered in iDRAC 6 releases. As of May 2019, the current version was 2.63.60.62.

With the introduction of iDRAC 7, the licensing model has changed. iDRAC 7 now supports lifecycle controller. Some features of Lifecycle controller are licensed and to access those features via iDRAC the correct licenses for those functions need to be enabled.

Supported hardware platforms 
iDRAC 7 runs on generation 12 PowerEdge servers. Per introduction in March 2012 the following servers use iDRAC7:
 PowerEdge T620 – tower model of 620, can be converted to 5U rack system
 PowerEdge R220 – native rack server, 1U
 PowerEdge R320 – native rack server, 1U
 PowerEdge R420 – native rack server, 1U
 PowerEdge R520 – native rack server, 2U
 PowerEdge R620 – native rack server, 1U
 PowerEdge M620 – blade server for M1000e enclosure, half-height (max 16 per chassis)
 PowerEdge R720 – rack-server, 2U
 PowerEdge R720xd – an R720 with additional 2.5" hard drive bays in the front and rear of the enclosure

Supported operating systems 
iDRAC 7 is supported by the following operating systems
 Microsoft Windows Server 2016, x64
 Microsoft Windows Server 2012, x64
 Microsoft Windows Server 2008 SP2 (standard, enterprise and datacenter editions), x86 and x64
 Microsoft Windows Server 2008 R2 SP1 (standard, enterprise and datacenter editions), x64
 Microsoft Small Business Server 2011, x64
 SUSE Linux Enterprise Server (SLES) 10 and 11, x64
 Red Hat Enterprise Linux (RHEL), 5.8 (x86/x64), 6.1 (x64) and 6.3 (x64)
 Microsoft Hyper-V (with Windows server 2008) and Hyper-V R2 (Windows Server 2008 R2)
 VMware ESX/ESXi 4.1, Update 2
 VMWare ESXi 5 Patch 01
 Citrix Systems Xen Server 6

Supported web browsers 
The GUI for iDRAC7 uses a Web browser and Java. Internet Explorer 7, 8 and 9, as well as  Firefox 6 + 7 were tested for different operating systems.

Limitations 
To take advantage of storage greater than 256 MB on the iDRAC6 enterprise, Dell requires that a vFlash SD card be procured through Dell channels. As of December 2011, Dell vFlash SD cards differ from consumer SD cards by being over-provisioned by 100% for increased write endurance and performance.

While there are no other known functional differences between a Dell-branded vFlash SD card and a class 2 or greater SDHC card, the use of non-Dell media prevents the use of extended capacities and functions.

On a Linux client system the standard arrow and print screen keys cannot be used in the iDRAC6 Java virtual console application because of some incompatible key event IDs; however, the arrow keys on the numeric keypad can still be used.

Some combinations of DRAC firmware, web browser, and Java runtime do not support virtual media via the Java applet or the plugin in DRAC5 and iDRAC6.

References

External links 
 Integrated Dell Remote Access Controller (iDRAC) on Dell's website
 Available manuals for iDRAC7
 Dell Remote Access Controller 6 (iDRAC 6)
 Dell Remote Access Controller 5 (DRAC 5) Version 1.20
 DRAC II/III product info from Dell
 Dell Remote Access Controller User Guides
 Managing out-of-band management in InfoWorld
 Dell DRAC 5 Remote SSH Console Redirection
 iDRAC7/iDRAC8 feature comparison

Out-of-band management
 Dell products